Stella Maris (from the Latin for "star of the sea") was a steamship built in 1882 as the Royal Navy gunboat HMS Starling and converted to  steam tug in 1905. Stella Maris played a major role in the events of the Halifax Explosion in 1917.

Stella Maris was built in Poplar, England in 1882 by Samuda Bios as a Banterer-class gunboat, HMS Starling. Starling was composite-built (wooden planks on iron frames) and armed with two 6-inch and two 3.75-inch guns. Starling was sold for merchant service in 1905. 

As Stella Maris, the tug was owned by Halifax Trading & Sealing Co, run by James Augustus Farquhar.

On 6 December 1917, Stella Maris, with Captain Horatio Harris Brannen and 23 others aboard, was towing two scows near mid-channel in the Narrows of Halifax Harbour leading into Bedford Basin. Shortly before the explosion, the tug had to hastily change course to avoid the outbound  which was departing Bedford Basin. Imo then collided with Mont Blanc, a French munitions ship. The collision started a fire on Mont Blanc, forcing the crew to evacuate. The burning ship then began drifting towards Halifax's Pier 6 on the western shore. Stella Maris anchored its barges to respond to the fire and approached the burning munitions ship, spraying the flames with its fire hose. As the fire was too intense to stop with a single fire hose, the Stella Mariss crew began to prepare a towline to pull the French vessel away from Pier 6 and prevent the fire from spreading ashore. The crew were in the process of retrieving a ten-inch hawser from the hold to assist a party of volunteers from 's steam pinnace in securing a line to Mont Blanc.  Before this could be done, the explosion occurred. 

The Halifax Explosion was the largest man-made blast prior to the Trinity test of the atomic bomb. Stella Maris was severely damaged and thrown up on the beach near Pier 6 with the bow ashore and the shattered stern submerged. Nineteen of the crew were killed, including Captain Brannen, but five managed to survive and two provided important eyewitness testimony at the investigation into the disaster. The tug was salvaged and rebuilt for service in the First World War.

References

Tugboats of Canada
World War I minesweepers of the United Kingdom
1882 ships
Halifax Explosion ships
Maritime incidents in 1917
World War I merchant ships of Canada